The 2020 VizCom 200 was the 11th stock car race of the 2020 ARCA Menards Series and the 32nd iteration of the event. The race was held on Sunday, August 9, 2020, in Brooklyn, Michigan at Michigan International Speedway, a two-mile (3.2 km) moderate-banked D-shaped speedway. The race took the scheduled 100 laps to complete. At race's end, Riley Herbst of Joe Gibbs Racing would dominate the late stages of the race to win his second and to date, final career ARCA Menards Series win and his first and only win of the season. To fill out the podium, Bret Holmes of Bret Holmes Racing and Michael Self of Venturini Motorsports would finish second and third, respectively.

Background 

The race was held at Michigan International Speedway, a two-mile (3.2 km) moderate-banked D-shaped speedway located in Brooklyn, Michigan. The track is used primarily for NASCAR events. It is known as a "sister track" to Texas World Speedway as MIS's oval design was a direct basis of TWS, with moderate modifications to the banking in the corners, and was used as the basis of Auto Club Speedway. The track is owned by International Speedway Corporation. Michigan International Speedway is recognized as one of motorsports' premier facilities because of its wide racing surface and high banking (by open-wheel standards; the 18-degree banking is modest by stock car standards).

Entry list

Practice 
The only 30-minute practice session was held on Sunday, August 9.

Starting lineup 
As no qualifying session was held, the starting lineup was determined by the current 2020 owner's points. As a result, Riley Herbst of Joe Gibbs Racing would win the pole.

Full starting lineup

Race results

References 

2020 ARCA Menards Series
NASCAR races at Michigan International Speedway
August 2020 sports events in the United States
2020 in sports in Michigan